The 2010 Carlton Football Club season was the Carlton Football Club's 147th season of competition, and 114th as a member of the Australian Football League.

Carlton finished 8th out of 16 teams in the 2010 AFL season, and reached the finals for the second consecutive season. Captain Chris Judd won the Brownlow Medal as fairest and best player in the league.

Club summary
The 2010 AFL season was the 114th season of the VFL/AFL competition since its inception in 1897; and, having competed in every season, it was also the 114th season contested by the Carlton Football Club.

Former club champion Stephen Kernahan continued as club president in the 2010 season, a position he had held since August 2008. The club's joint major sponsors were car manufacturer Hyundai, which had been with the club since 2008, and confectionery company Mars, newly signed for the 2010 season. As in previous years, the club's primary home ground was Etihad Stadium, with home games expecting to draw larger crowds played at the M.C.G., and with traditional home ground Visy Park serving as the training and administrative base. As had been the case every year since 2003, Carlton had a full alignment with the Northern Bullants in the Victorian Football League, allowing Carlton-listed players to play with the Bullants when not selected in AFL matches.

Carlton sold a total of 40,480 memberships for the 2010 season, down 4.6% from the club's record-high 2009 membership of 42,408. The club had the fifth-highest membership in the league, and the second-highest of clubs who play home games only in Victoria, behind only Collingwood. The club's membership campaign slogan for 2010 was "Can you smell what the Blues are cooking", borrowed from the catchphrase used by WWE wrestler Dwayne "The Rock" Johnson.

Brett Ratten and Chris Judd continued in their respective roles as senior coach and captain of the club, each entering his third season appointed to the job. Kade Simpson continued in the role of vice-captain, and the club's leadership group also comprised Michael Jamison, Andrew Carrazzo, Heath Scotland and Simon Wiggins.

Squad and player statistics for 2010
Flags represent the state of origin, i.e. the state in which the player played his Under-18s football.

Playing list changes
The following summarises all player changes between the conclusion of the 2009 season and the conclusion of the 2010 season.

The Fevola trade
The most significant change to the list was the trading of full forward Brendan Fevola to the Brisbane Lions. Carlton announced its intentions to trade Fevola after his drunken behaviour at the 2009 Brownlow Medal Count, which served as the last straw in a long rap sheet of off-field indiscretions while at the club.

The Brisbane Lions emerged as the likely destination. Brisbane initially offered 31-year-old full forward Daniel Bradshaw and 23-year-old midfielder Michael Rischitelli in the trade. Both players were flown to Melbourne to tour Carlton's facilities during trade week, but Rischitelli was not willing to relocate. On the final day of trade week, Brisbane agreed to give Carlton a first round draft pick and 19-year-old key position prospect Lachlan Henderson (who was himself a first round draft pick, taken at No. 8 in the 2007 National Draft), in exchange for Fevola, a second-round draft pick, and for Carlton to pay $100,000 of Fevola's salary for each of the two years remaining on his existing contract. Fevola left the club as its third-highest career goalkicker, with 575 goals.

Although considered reasonable at the time, the trade is now widely viewed as a disaster for the Brisbane Lions, because all players involved in the trade negotiations had left the club within eighteen months. Shortly after trade, Bradshaw walked out on the Lions, and was recruited to the Sydney Swans in the pre-season draft – either because his feelings were hurt by being offered to trade, or because Fevola's recruitment would have limited Bradshaw's own opportunities in the Lions' forward-line. Rischitelli left the club at the end of 2010, after signing a contract with the fledgling Gold Coast Football Club; some in the media speculated that he was also disgruntled about being offered in the Fevola trade, but Rischitelli has never said anything to this effect. Finally, prior to the 2011 season, Brisbane sacked Fevola after further off-field incidents during the 2010/11 offseason. For its part, Carlton gained only a moderate benefit from the trade, with Henderson and No. 12 draft pick Kane Lucas giving the club six and five years service respectively, with only one top-ten finish in the club's best and fairest award between them: a third-place finish by Henderson in 2013.

In

Out

List management

Season summary

Pre-season matches

NAB Cup

NAB Challenge

Regular season
Despite winning thirteen games in 2009 and finishing in the finals for the first time since 2001, Carlton was considered unlikely to make the finals again in 2010, as pundits believed the club's forward-line would not be able to cover the loss of Brendan Fevola. True to those expectations, Carlton's performance in 2010 was slightly worse that of 2009, finishing with an even 11–11 record; but that was good enough to finish eighth and in the finals for the second consecutive season, finishing ahead of ninth-placed  by a considerable margin of percentage. The club's results were generally consistent with its finishing position, with a record of only 2–8 in ten matches against other top eight teams, and a record of 9–3 in twelve matches against the bottom eight teams.

Finals

Ladder

Leading Goalkickers 
Eddie Betts was Carlton's leading goalkicker for 2010. It was the first time Betts had won the club goalkicking, and his tally of 42 goals was a new season high for Betts. The win ended a streak of seven consecutive years in which the club goalkicking was won by Brendan Fevola, who was traded at the start of the season.

Team awards and records
Game records
 Round 4 – Carlton defeated Adelaide by 48 points, despite having two fewer scoring shots. It was the equal-largest victory by the team with fewer scoring shots since Round 10, 1992.
 Round 7 – Carlton defeated St Kilda for the first time since 2001, ending a twelve-game losing streak against that opponent. The losing streak, along with a concurrent twelve-game losing streak against Sydney which was ended in 2009, was the club's equal-longest losing streak against a single opponent since 1902.
 Round 19 – Carlton scored 10.3 (63) in the final quarter against . It was Carlton's highest-scoring quarter, and first ten-goal quarter, since Round 18, 2000.

Season records
Carlton conceded 1983 points in the home and away season, its fewest since 2001.

Notable events
Pre-Christmas booze cruise
The playing group generated significant controversy at a booze cruise during the 2009/10 offseason. The event was held in late December 2008, at the start of the Christmas break, and involved widespread binge drinking amongst the group. Three players were then involved in alcohol-related incidents after the cruise docked: Andrew Walker and Ryan Houlihan both brawled with security at Crown Casino, and Eddie Betts was arrested for being drunk in a public place; all three were fined by the club, and the entire playing group was censured for its behaviour. The club was also issued a 'please explain' by the league, which was concerned about the effect the incident would have on the image of the game in the community.

Round 12 – 25th anniversary of Friday night football
In Round 12, North Melbourne hosted Carlton on Friday night in a match which celebrated the 25th anniversary of Friday Night Football, which North Melbourne had originally pioneered in 1985. After this year, North Melbourne requested that it host Carlton in a Friday night match each year – a match of annual significance for North Melbourne, because at the time it was a low-drawing team, and was otherwise seldom scheduled in the prime Friday night timeslot.

Individual awards and records

John Nicholls Medal
The Carlton Football Club Best and Fairest awards night took place on 4 October. The John Nicholls Medal, for the best and fairest player of the club, as well as several other awards, were presented on the night.

John Nicholls Medal
The voting system for the John Nicholls Medal remained the same as in 2009. In each match, the five members of the Match Committee awarded votes. Each committee member could award votes to up to eight players, and each player could receive up to ten votes from each judge. A "perfect score" for a round is 50 votes. The player with the most total votes across all premiership season matches (including home and away matches and finals) wins the award.

The winner of the John Nicholls Medal was Chris Judd, who polled 473 votes. It was Judd's third consecutive John Nicholls Medal, in only his third season at the club. The win made Judd only the second player, after John Nicholls, to win Carlton's best and fairest award in three consecutive seasons. Judd won comfortably ahead of Jordan Russell (354 votes) and Marc Murphy (343 votes). The top ten is given below.

Other awards
The following other awards were presented on John Nicholls Medal night:-
Best First-Year Player – Kane Lucas
Best Clubman – Michael Jamison
Women of Carlton Ambassador Award – Aaron Joseph
Spirit of Carlton Encouragement Award – Jeff Garlett
Carltonians Achievement Award – Kade Simpson

Brownlow Medal
Chris Judd won the 2010 Brownlow Medal. He polled 30 votes, to finish four votes ahead of second-placed Gary Ablett, Jr. (Geelong), and six votes ahead of pre-count favourite Dane Swan (Collingwood). Judd became the 13th player to win more than one Brownlow Medal, and the fourth to do so at more than one club. Judd was the fifth Carlton player to win a Brownlow Medal, and the first since Greg Williams in 1994.

Judd polled his thirty votes in only nineteen matches, after missing the first three weeks of the season with a suspension carried over from a misconduct charge in the 2009 Elimination Final; he then polled three votes in each of his first five matches to take the lead in the count, and was not headed thereafter.

AFLPA Awards
For each of the AFLPA awards, one or three Carlton players were nominated following internal vote of Carlton players (except for Best Captain, where captain Chris Judd was nominated by default). A vote of all players in the league, selecting from a ballot of all club nominees, was then used to determine the final placings. None of Carlton's nominees went on to win their awards.

Leigh Matthews Trophy (Most Valuable Player)
Eddie Betts (nominated)
Chris Judd (nominated)
Kade Simpson (nominated)
Robert Rose Award (Most Courageous Player)
Kade Simpson (nominated)
Best First Year Player
Kane Lucas (nominated)
Best Captain
Chris Judd (nominated by default)

Other awards
All-Australian Team
The 40-man squad for the All-Australian Team was announced on 31 August 2010, and the final team of 22 was announced on 13 September 2010. Chris Judd was the only Carlton player nominated in the squad, and he was named on the interchange in the final team.

Representative honours
Kade Simpson, Bryce Gibbs and Eddie Betts were all selected to represent Australia in the 2010 International Rules Series, held in Ireland. Simpson was selected as one of the team's three vice-captains.

AFL Rising Star
Two Carlton players were nominated for the AFL Rising Star award during the season:
Round 1 – Chris Yarran
Round 19 – Jeff Garlett

Garlett went on to poll five votes in the final count, to finish sixth for the award.

Other
Five people were inducted into the Carlton Football Club Hall of Fame, in the first batch of new inductees since the 2006 season. The new inductees were:
Ron Barassi, dual premiership coach, one-time premiership player, and former captain-coach
Vin Gardiner, dual premiership player and one-time league leading goalkicker.
John Goold, dual premiership player
Anthony Koutoufides, premiership player, former captain, Leigh Matthews Trophy winner and dual best-and-fairest
David Parkin, three-time premiership coach

Northern Bullants 
The Carlton Football Club had a full affiliation with the Northern Bullants during the 2010 season. It was the eighth season of the clubs' affiliation, which had been in place since 2003. Carlton senior- and rookie-listed players who were not selected to play in the Carlton team were eligible to play for either the Northern Bullants seniors or reserves team. Home games were shared between the Bullants' traditional home ground, Preston City Oval, and Carlton's traditional home ground, Visy Park. Carlton development coach David Teague served also as the senior coach for the Bullants during the season.

The Bullants finished second out of fourteen in the VFL, after being defeated in the grand final by North Ballarat. It was the second consecutive season that the club had been beaten by the Roosters in the grand final. The Bullants had finished sixth on the ladder after the home-and-away season with a record of 10–8, but progressed to the grand final with upset wins against third-placed Casey and minor premiers Williamstown in the semi- and preliminary finals. By finishing inside the top three, the Bullants qualified for the inaugural season of the Foxtel Cup competition in 2011.

Notes
:1. Although Hawthorn had a higher overall membership, that Victorian-based club additionally plays several home games in Tasmania each year.
:2. Ratten also served as head coach in the final six rounds of 2007 as caretaker, before being officially appointed as head coach for 2008.

References

Carlton Football Club seasons
2010 in Australian rules football
2010 Australian Football League season